Usan-do is a historical name for an island in the
Sea of Japan described in Korean records.  It was part of the ancient state of Usan-guk, but its exact identity is disputed.  It may refer to:
 Ulleungdo
 Jukdo, a Korean island 4 km east of Ulleungdo.
 The Liancourt Rocks, a disputed group of islets now known as Dokdo in Korea and Takeshima in Japan.

Old Korean maps of Usan-do

See also
Lee Kyu-Won

Islands of the Sea of Japan
History of Korea